Dinin may refer to:
River Dinin, Ireland
Dinin Do'Urden, a Forgotten Realms character